Or Eitan (אור איתן; born November 9, 1981) is an Israeli former basketball player. He was named to the 2006 Israeli Basketball Premier League Quintet.

Biography
He was born in Israel. Eitan is 6' 4" (193 cm) tall.

Eitan played the forward position. He played for Cholet Basket, Hapoel Gilboa Galil, Hapoel Tel Aviv, Elitzur Ashkelon, and Maccabi Rishon LeZion. He was named to the 2006 Israeli Basketball Premier League Quintet.

References 

Hapoel Gilboa Galil Elyon players

Cholet Basket players
Hapoel Tel Aviv B.C. players

1981 births
Israeli men's basketball players
Maccabi Rishon LeZion basketball players

Living people